Dexter is a city in Washtenaw County in the U.S. state of Michigan. The population was 4,067 at the 2010 census. 

Dexter Township is located to the northwest and does not border the city, and the two are administered autonomously.  The township and city are named for Samuel William Dexter, the founder of the village and the first circuit judge of Washtenaw County.

History

The area was first settled in 1824, 13 years before Michigan became a state, when land speculator Samuel W. Dexter purchased a large tract of land and originated the village. It was known as "Mill Creek Settlement" until the village was platted in 1830, when its name was officially changed to Dexter.

Mill Creek and the Huron River, which form much of the western and northeastern boundaries of the city, respectively, have long been valuable resources to Dexter. A sawmill was built in 1827, a woolen mill in 1838, a grist mill in 1844, and a cider mill in 1886. After being appointed County Court Justice in 1826, Judge Dexter reportedly established a post office in his home, shuttling mail between there and Ann Arbor on horseback.

The founder of the original village, Samuel W. Dexter served as the chief justice of the Washtenaw County Court as well as being elected a University of Michigan regent. His home just northwest of the city overlooking Mill Creek was built in the early 1840s in Greek Revival architecture and is a recognizable landmark in the area. Samuel Dexter called it Gordon Hall to honor his mother's family.  Gordon Hall was built by Calvin T. Fillmore, an architect and builder in the area.  Calvin was a brother of president Millard Fillmore.  Samuel Dexter was a staunch abolitionist, and it is nearly certain that Gordon Hall was a stop on the Underground Railroad (amongst other evidence, Gordon Hall contained secret areas in the basement, accessible only through hidden doorways).

(In 2006, the property was purchased by the Dexter Area Historical Society and Museum, with the goal of preserving and restoring the home).

On March 20, 1966, the Dexter area experienced "one of the most infamous of all UFO sightings in history" when local truck driver Frank Mannor spotted a glowing object near his home.  Astronomer J. Allen Hynek visited Dexter and declared the object was probably caused by "swamp gas," a term which has since become closely affiliated with UFO sightings.  Hynek's swamp gas theory prompted then-Michigan Congressman (and future president) Gerald R. Ford to call for a thorough Congressional investigation of "the rash of reported sightings of unidentified flying objects in southern Michigan".

On Thursday, March 15, 2012, Dexter was struck by a large EF3 tornado causing substantial damage to local houses and businesses, yet no injuries were reported.

On November 4, 2014, Dexter residents voted to adopt a new charter, officially turning the former village into a city.

Geography

Dexter is located along the Huron River and contains small portions of two metro parks: Hudson Mills Metropark and Dexter–Huron Metropark.  The Border-to-Border Trail runs through the city.

Transportation
The WAVE Community Connector Bus stops at several Dexter locations daily and on weekends.  Its regular route travels between Chelsea and Ann Arbor, where it transfers to AATA bus #30.

Washtenaw County's Border-to-Border Trail links downtown Dexter to Hudson Mills Metropark.  A connecting trail to Dexter-Huron Metropark is also under construction. Completion is estimated to be in Autumn 2019.

Dexter has a depot built around 1840 when the Central Railroad of Michigan from Detroit ended here. Today, no trains stop here, but it is the home of the Ann Arbor Model Railroad Club, and is almost completely surrounded by old railroad memorabilia, such as old level crossing signals and baggage carts.

Downtown Dexter's main thoroughfares were originally known as A, B, C, D, and E Streets. Today, these are known as Alpine, Broad, Central, Dover, and Edison Streets.

Demographics

2010 census
As of the census of 2010, there were 4,067 people, 1,590 households, and 1,067 families residing in the city. The racial makeup of the city was 92.7% White, 1.1% African American, 0.4% Native American, 2.8% Asian, 0.8% from other races, and 2.2% from two or more races. Hispanic or Latino people of any race were 2.8% of the population. Since the 2000 census, Dexter's population grew 62.9%, the largest population growth in the state during that time period.

There were 1,590 households, of which 42.6% had children under the age of 18 living with them, 51.8% were married couples living together, 12.3% had a female householder with no husband present, 3.1% had a male householder with no wife present, and 32.9% were non-families. 28.2% of all households were made up of individuals, and 8.7% had someone living alone who was 65 years of age or older. The average household size was 2.56 and the average family size was 3.20.

The median age in the city was 36.2 years. 31% of residents were under the age of 18; 4.8% were between the ages of 18 and 24; 32.6% were from 25 to 44; 23.2% were from 45 to 64; and 8.6% were 65 years of age or older. The gender makeup of the city was 47.1% male and 52.9% female.

2000 census
At the 2000 census, there were 2,338 people, 1,013 households and 641 families residing in the city. The racial makeup of the city was 96.58% White, 0.43% African American, 0.30% Native American, 1.03% Asian, 0.26% from other races, and 1.41% from two or more races. Hispanic or Latino people of any race were 0.98% of the population.

There were 1,013 households, of which 34.5% had children under the age of 18 living with them, 46.6% were married couples living together, 13.2% had a female householder with no husband present, and 36.7% were non-families. 32.3% of all households were made up of individuals, and 9.0% had someone living alone who was 65 years of age or older. The average household size was 2.31 and the average family size was 2.92.

26.4% of the population were under the age of 18, 6.6% from 18 to 24, 38.1% from 25 to 44, 19.0% from 45 to 64, and 9.8% who were 65 years of age or older. The median age was 34 years. For every 100 females, there were 94.7 males. For every 100 females age 18 and over, there were 88.2 males.

The median household income was $50,510, and the median family income was $62,697. Males had a median income of $49,375 versus $30,213 for females. The per capita income for the city was $27,974. About 2.8% of families and 4.5% of the population were below the poverty line, including 6.3% of those under age 18 and 3.7% of those age 65 or over.

Arts and Culture
In 2008 The Encore Musical Theatre Company was founded at 3126 Broad Street by Broadway veteran and Michigan native Dan Cooney and Anne & Paul Koch. 
The Encore Musical Theatre Company is a non-profit musical theatre, recognized by Actors' Equity Association, located in the historic City of Dexter. Their mission is to create quality, original theatrical productions with an emphasis on Musical Theatre, utilizing a unique mixture of Broadway and Local talent of all levels, while engaging and entertaining a wide spectrum of the surrounding communities. 
In 2020 The Encore Musical Theatre Company purchased the Copeland Building, at 7714 Ann Arbor Street, from Dexter Schools where they will resume productions once renovations are completed. During the Coronavirus pandemic, the company got creative and offered performances on an outdoor stage at their new location.

Media
Dexter is served by two weekly newspapers. The Dexter Leader covers events in Dexter and Washtenaw County. The Sun Times News is a weekly newspaper with a free mailed distribution that covers events in Dexter, Chelsea, and surrounding rural areas.

The Ann Arbor News (and its Mlive online component) regularly includes coverage of events and stories in Dexter.

The quarterly Community Observer is delivered free to all permanent residents of Dexter and covers events in Dexter, Saline and Chelsea. The Observer also produces a Community Guide each fall.

Dexter High School publishes The Squall a student-run newspaper that is also available to Dexter residents via subscription. It has won several national high school journalism awards.

Education

Dexter Community Schools is the public school district that serves Dexter residents. Schools in the district include Beacon Elementary School (Y5-2), Anchor Elementary School (Y5-2), Wylie Elementary School (3-4), Creekside Intermediate School (5-6), Mill Creek Middle School (7-8), and Dexter High School. Dexter High School is ranked 31st among high schools in Michigan.

Dexter Community Schools is part of the larger Washtenaw Intermediate School District (WISD), which also serves Ann Arbor and other surrounding communities.

Dexter is also served by several nearby private and charter schools, including Daycroft Montessori, Emerson School (K-8), and Honey Creek Community School (K-8).

The  Dexter Cooperative Nursery School is a non-profit community-run preschool.

Since 2012, Dexter High School has offered an International Baccalaureate Diploma Programme.

Athletics
Dexter is home to the high school boys' cross country team that tied the state record for most consecutive Michigan High School Athletic Association state championship titles with five, winning from 2002 through 2006.

Since 2011, the city of Dexter has been home to a vintage base ball team called the Union Base Ball Club of Dexter.

Founded in 1978, the Dexter Ringers Horseshoe Club is a competitive horseshoe club that plays its annual season every summer at Dexter's First Street Park. The public park is located on Edison Street, and features twelve horseshoe pits.

In 2003, the Dexter Baseball Club was formed. It later became the Dexter Little League (DLL) and has 400–500 boys and girls aged 6 to 14 playing on 40+ baseball and softball teams each year. The DLL hosted the 8–10 boys state baseball tournament in 2019.

Notable people
Dr. Royal S. Copeland, US senator from New York and sponsor of early food and drug legislation
Benny Frey, Major League Baseball player who pitched for the Cincinnati Reds
Arthur Hills, golf course architect
Harrison Jeffords, colonel in the Union Army and a hero of the Battle of Gettysburg
Mark Koernke, right-wing militia activist
Rob Malda, open-source software proponent and founder of Slashdot
Katharine Dexter McCormick, biologist, women's suffragette, and philanthropist; known as the "mother of the pill," she funded the research that led to the birth control pill (along with Margaret Sanger)
Edie Parker, Beat generation figure and wife of Jack Kerouac; Kerouac-Parker's family owned the Oak Ridge Farm in Dexter
Milo Radulovich, symbol of 1950s red scare resistance who was featured on journalist Edward R. Murrow's October 20, 1953 episode of See It Now

References

External links

City of Dexter official website
Dexter Area Chamber of Commerce
Dexter District Library
Dexter Area Historical Society & Museum
Discover Dexter

Cities in Washtenaw County, Michigan
Populated places established in 1824
1824 establishments in Michigan Territory
Populated places on the Underground Railroad